The 1950 Georgia gubernatorial election was held on November 7, 1950. Incumbent Governor Herman Talmadge won the Democratic primary over Melvin Thompson on June 28 with 49.33% of the vote and 295 out of 410 county unit votes. The primary was a rematch of the 1948 special election. This would be the last gubernatorial rematch in the state until 2022.

At this time, Georgia was a one-party state, and the Democratic nomination was tantamount to victory. Talmadge was re-elected in the November general election without an opponent.

Democratic primary

County unit system
From 1917 until 1962, the Democratic Party in the U.S. state of Georgia used a voting system called the county unit system to determine victors in statewide primary elections.

The system was ostensibly designed to function similarly to the Electoral College, but in practice the large ratio of unit votes for small, rural counties to unit votes for more populous urban areas provided outsized political influence to the smaller counties.

Under the county unit system, the 159 counties in Georgia were divided by population into three categories. The largest eight counties were classified as "Urban", the next-largest 30 counties were classified as "Town", and the remaining 121 counties were classified as "Rural". Urban counties were given 6 unit votes, Town counties were given 4 unit votes, and Rural counties were given 2 unit votes, for a total of 410 available unit votes. Each county's unit votes were awarded on a winner-take-all basis.

Candidates were required to obtain a majority of unit votes (not necessarily a majority of the popular vote), or 206 total unit votes, to win the election. If no candidate received a majority in the initial primary, a runoff election was held between the top two candidates to determine a winner.

Candidates
 Pat Avery
 C.O. Baker
 J.W. Jenkins
Herman Talmadge, incumbent Governor since 1948
Melvin Thompson, former Governor (1947–48)

Results

General election

Results

References

1950
1950 Georgia (U.S. state) elections
Georgia
November 1950 events in the United States